Constantine Kontomytes or Contomytes was a Byzantine general and nobleman.

Biography
As the governor (strategos) of the Thracesian Theme, Constantine Kontomytes inflicted a severe defeat on the Cretan Saracens in 841, when they raided the rich monastic community of Mount Latros. Shortly before or soon after, Constantine's daughter married the magistros Bardas, who was the nephew of Empress Theodora on his mother's side and of Patriarch Photios on his father's. Bardas later assumed his father-in-law's surname.

In 859, Emperor Michael III (r. 842–867) sent him to Sicily at the head of 300 ships, to confront the Arabs on the island. The Byzantine army suffered a major defeat by the Arabs under Abbas ibn Fadhl, however, and were forced back onto their ships.

References

Sources

9th-century Byzantine people
Byzantine generals
Byzantine people of the Arab–Byzantine wars
Byzantine governors of Sicily
People of the Muslim conquest of Sicily
Governors of the Thracesian Theme